80 Squadron or 80th Squadron may refer to:

 No. 80 Squadron RAAF, a unit of the Royal Australian Air Force
 No. 80 Squadron RAF, a former unit of the Royal Air Force
 80th UAV Squadron (Belgium), a unit of the Belgian Air Force
 80th Fighter Squadron (United States), a unit of the United States Air Force